René-Daniel Dubois, OC (born July 20, 1955, in Montreal) is a Québécois playwright and actor.

Biography

Movie career
He is best known for his 1985 play Being at Home with Claude, which was adapted into an award-winning film in 1992 and the 2009 thriller drama 5150 Elm's Way. He was also a winner of the Governor General's Award for French language drama in 1984 for Ne blâmez jamais les Bédouins.

Theatrical career
Dubois' other plays have included Panique à Longueuil, 2 contes parmi tant d’autres pour une tribu perdue, 26 bis, impasse du colonel Foisy, Le printemps, monsieur Deslauriers and Le Troisième fils du professeur Yourolov, as well as the French translation of Timothy Findley's Elizabeth Rex (Elizabeth, roi d'Angleterre) and the French-Canadian adaptation of Mary Jones's Stones in His Pockets (Des roches dans ses poches).

Personal life
He is openly gay.

References

External links
 Critical bibliography (Auteurs.contemporain.info) 
 Biography on the Canadian Encyclopedia
 

1955 births
Living people
20th-century Canadian dramatists and playwrights
21st-century Canadian dramatists and playwrights
Writers from Montreal
Canadian gay writers
Canadian LGBT dramatists and playwrights
Gay dramatists and playwrights
Governor General's Award-winning dramatists
Canadian dramatists and playwrights in French
Canadian male dramatists and playwrights
20th-century Canadian male writers
21st-century Canadian male writers
Officers of the Order of Canada
21st-century Canadian LGBT people
20th-century Canadian LGBT people